The following is a timeline of the history of the city of Birmingham, Alabama, USA.

19th century

 1871
 Birmingham founded and incorporated.
 Robert Henley becomes mayor.
 1874
 Birmingham becomes seat of Jefferson County.
 First Colored Baptist Church founded.
 Cholera epidemic.
 1874 - Birmingham Iron Age newspaper in publication.
 1880 - Population: 3,086.
 1881 - Alabama Christian Advocate newspaper begins publication.
 1882
 Sloss Furnace begins operating.
 O'Brien's Opera House opens.
 1887 - Howard College active in East Lake.
 1888 - Evening News and Birmingham Age-Herald newspapers in publication.
 1890
 Population: 26,178.
 Labor Advocate newspaper begins publication.
 1891 - Birmingham Commercial Club incorporated.
 1893
 Cathedral of Saint Paul built.
 St. Mark's School opens.
 1895
 Tennessee Coal, Iron and Railroad Company headquarters relocated to Birmingham.
 Birmingham Conservatory of Music established.
 1896 - Spencer Business College established.
 1900 - Population: 38,415.

20th century

1900s-1950s
 1901 - March 25: Storm.
 1907
 Tennessee Coal, Iron and Railroad Company acquired by United States Steel Corporation.
 Miles Memorial College active in nearby Fairfield.
 1909
 City expands to include Ensley, North Birmingham, Pratt City, Woodlawn.
 Birmingham Terminal Station and Empire Building constructed.
 1910 - Population: 132,685.
 1912 - John Hand Building constructed.
 1913 - City Federal Building constructed.
 1916
 October 18: 1916 Irondale earthquake.
 Robert E. Lee Klan No.1 formed.
 1917 - Civitan Club founded.
 1918 - Birmingham–Southern College established.
 1919 - Alabama Federation of Business and Professional Women's Clubs formed in Birmingham.
 1920
 Progressive Farmer magazine headquartered in Birmingham.
 Population: 178,806.
 1922 - WAPI radio begins broadcasting.
 1923 - Traffic lights installed.
 1924 - Avondale Sun newspaper begins publication.
 1925 - WBRC radio begins broadcasting.
 1927 - Alabama Theatre opens.
 1928 - Exchange-Security Bank established.
 1929 - Thomas Jefferson Hotel built.
 1930
 Southern Worker newspaper begins publication.
 Population: 259,678.
 1933 - Mine, Mill and Smelter Workers Union active.
 1936
 Local Steel Workers Organizing Committee formed.
 Vulcan statue erected atop Red Mountain.
 1940 - Population: 267,583.
 1942 - Birmingham Historical Society founded.
 1949 - WAPI-TV  and WBRC-TV (television) begin broadcasting.
 1950
 Birmingham Post-Herald newspaper in publication.
 Population: 326,037.
 1955 - Birmingham Zoo established.
 1956
 Alabama Christian Movement for Human Rights headquartered in Birmingham.
 Alabama Symphony Orchestra active.
 1958 - EBSCO Industries in business.
 1959 - West End Hills Missionary Baptist Church built.

1960s-1990s
 1960
 Briarwood Presbyterian Church (later megachurch) established.
 Eastwood Mall in business.
 Population: 340,887.
 1961 - First Baptist Church, Kingston built.
 1962 - Two North Twentieth built.
 1963
 April 3: Birmingham campaign for civil rights begins.
 April 16: Martin Luther King Jr. writes his "Letter from Birmingham Jail", first published in June 1963 issues of Liberation, The Christian Century, and The New Leader.
 May: Birmingham riot of 1963.
 September 15: 16th Street Baptist Church bombing.
 Birmingham Botanical Gardens open.
 1965
 Airport Drive-In cinema opens.
 Southern Museum of Flight established.
 1966 - Southern Living magazine headquartered in Birmingham.
 1969 - Birmingham Terminal Station demolished.
 1970
 Daniel Building constructed.
 Population: 300,910.
 1971 - First Alabama Bancshares headquartered in city.
 1972 - South Central Bell Building and First National-Southern Natural Building built.
 1975 - Birmingham Vulcans football team formed.
 1979 - Richard Arrington, Jr. becomes mayor.
 1980 - Population: 284,413.
 1982
 Community Food Bank of Central Alabama and Bama 6 cinema open.
 Sister city agreement established with Hitachi, Japan.
 1986
 South Trust Tower built.
 Alabama Humanities Foundation headquartered in Birmingham.
 1988 - AmSouth-Harbert Plaza (hi-rise) built.
 1990
 Birmingham Islamic Society formed.
 Population: 265,968.
 1992 - Birmingham Civil Rights Institute established.
 1993
 Alabama Jazz Hall of Fame opens.
 Spencer Bachus becomes U.S. representative for Alabama's 6th congressional district.
 1995 - Sister city agreement established with Székesfehérvár, Hungary.
 1996
 City website online (approximate date).
 Sister city agreement established with Anshan, China.
 1997 - Sister city agreement established with Gweru, Zimbabwe.
 1998
 April 6–9, 1998 tornado outbreak.
 Establishment of sister city agreement with Pomigliano d'Arco, Naples, Italy, and friendship city agreements with Chaoyang District, Beijing, China, and Maebashi, Japan.
 1999 - Friendship city agreement established with Krasnodon, Ukraine.
 2000 - Population: 242,840.

21st century

 2001 - Church of the Highlands (megachurch) founded.
 2003 - Sister city agreement established with Vinnytsia, Ukraine.
 2005
 Birmingham Post-Herald newspaper ceases publication.
 Locust Fork News-Journal'' begins publication.
 Sister city agreements established with Al-Karak, Jordan; Guédiawaye, Senegal; Plzeň, Czech Republic; and Rosh HaAyin, Israel.
 2009 - Sister city agreement established with Winneba, Ghana.
 2010
 Alabama Symphony Youth Orchestra formed.
 William A. Bell becomes mayor.
 Population: 212,237.
 2011 - Terri Sewell becomes U.S. representative for Alabama's 7th congressional district.
 2015
 Minimum wage approved in city.
 Sister city agreement established with Liverpool, England.
 2017 - Randall Woodfin becomes mayor.
 2020 - Population: 200,733.
 2021 - Birmingham Stallions football team is formed 
 2022 - 2022 World Games were hosted.

Images

See also
 History of Birmingham, Alabama
 List of mayors of Birmingham, Alabama
 National Register of Historic Places listings in Birmingham, Alabama
 List of neighborhoods in Birmingham, Alabama
 Timelines of other cities in Alabama: Huntsville, Mobile, Montgomery, Tuscaloosa

References

Bibliography

Published in 19th century
 
 
 John W. DuBose, ed., The Mineral Wealth of Alabama and Birmingham (Birmingham, 1886)
 
 
 Henry M. Caldwell, History of the Elyton Land Company and Birmingham, Ala. 1892.

Published in 20th century
 Code of City of Birmingham, Alabama. 1917.
  
 Cruikshank, A History of Birmingham and Its Environs (2 vols., Chicago, 1920)
 
 Harrison A. Trexler, "Birmingham's Struggle with Commission Government," National Municipal Review, XIV (November 1925)
 George R. Leighton, "Birmingham, Alabama: The City of Perpetual Promise," Harper's Magazine, CLXXV (August 1937)
 
 Florence H. W. Moss, Building Birmingham and Jefferson County (Birmingham, Ala.: Birmingham Printing Company, 1947)
 John C. Henley, Jr., This Is Birmingham: The Story of the Founding and Growth of an American City. 1960.
 Paul B. Worthman, "Black Workers and Labor Unions in Birmingham, Alabama, 1897-1904," Labor History, 10 (Summer 1969)
 Paul B. Worthman, "Working Class Mobility in Birmingham, Alabama, 1880-1914," in Anonymous Americans: Explorations in Nineteenth-Century Social History, ed. Tamara K. Hareven (Englewood Cliffs, 1971)
 
 McMillan, Malcolm C. Yesterday's Birmingham. Miami: E.A. Seeman Publishing, 1975.
 
 
 Valley and the Hills: An Illustrated History of Birmingham and Jefferson County. 1981
 
  1991-
 
 
 
 
 Lynne B. Feldman, A Sense of Place: Birmingham's Black Middle Class Community, 1890-1930 (Tuscaloosa, 1999)

Published in 21st century

External links

 
 Items related to Birmingham, various dates (via Digital Public Library of America)
 

Birmingham, Alabama-related lists
 
Birmingham
Years in Alabama